is a Japanese actor, known for portraying Byakuya Kuchiki in rock musical Bleach. He weighs 57 kilograms and is 174 centimeters tall. His nickname is Osamu-chan.

Musical
 Rock Musical BLEACH - Byakuya Kuchiki
 Rock Musical BLEACH Saien - Byakuya Kuchiki
 Rock Musical BLEACH The Dark of The Bleeding Moon  - Byakuya Kuchiki
 Rock Musical BLEACH Live Bankai Show Code 001 - Byakuya Kuchiki
 Rock Musical BLEACH No Clouds in the Blue Heaven - Byakuya Kuchiki
 Rock Musical BLEACH Live Bankai Show Code 002- Byakuya Kuchiki
 Rock Musical BLEACH Live Bankai Show Code 003- Byakuya Kuchiki
 Rock Musical BLEACH The All - Byakuya Kuchiki
 Hanasakeru Seishounen: The Budding Beauty - Quinza

External links
 Official blog (in Japanese)
 Official Homepage (in Japanese)
 Statistics (in Japanese

Japanese male actors
1979 births
Living people